The Portland Air Defense Sector (PADS) is an inactive United States Air Force organization.  Its last assignment was with the 25th Air Division,  being stationed at Adair Air Force Station, Oregon.  It was inactivated on 1 July 1969.

History 
PADS was established in June 1958 assuming control of former ADC Western Air Defense Force units in eastern Oregon and northwest California.  The organization provided command and control over several aircraft and radar squadrons.

On 1 June 1960 the new Semi Automatic Ground Environment (SAGE) Direction Center (DC-13) became operational.    DC-13  was equipped with dual AN/FSQ-7 Computers.   The day-to-day operations of the command was to train and maintain tactical flying units flying jet interceptor aircraft (F-94 Starfire; F-102 Delta Dagger; F-106 Delta Dart) in a state of readiness with training missions and series of exercises with SAC and other units simulating interceptions of incoming enemy aircraft.

The Sector was inactivated on 1 April 1966 as part of an ADC consolidation and reorganization; and its units were reassigned to 28th Air Division.  The 689th Radar Squadron (SAGE) was moved to DC-12, 25th Air Division, McChord AFB, WA, on 1 April 1966.

Lineage
 Established as Portland Air Defense Sector on 8 June 1958
 Inactivated on 1 April 1966

Assignments 
 25th Air Division, 8 June 1958 – 1 April 1966

Stations 
 Adair Air Force Station, Oregon, 8 June 1958 – 1 April 1966

Components

Groups
 337th Fighter Group (Air Defense)
 Portland IAP, Oregon, 15 April 1960-25 March 1966
 408th Fighter Group (Air Defense)
 Kingsley Field, Oregon, 15 April 1960-1 April 1966

Interceptor squadron
 82d Fighter-Interceptor Squadron
 Travis AFB, California, 1 August 1963-1 April 1966

Radar squadrons

 666th Radar Squadron
 Mill Valley AFS, California, 1 August 1963-1 April 1966
 689th Radar Squadron
 Mount Hebo AFS, Oregon, 1 March 1960-1 April 1966
 761st Radar Squadron
 North Bend AFS, Oregon, 1 March 1960-1 April 1966
 776th Radar Squadron
 Point Arena AFS, California, 1 August 1963-1 April 1966

 777th Radar Squadron
 Klamath AFS, Oregon, 1 March 1960-1 April 1966
 827th Radar Squadron
 Keno AFS, Oregon, 1 March 1960-1 April 1966
 859th Radar Squadron
 Red Bluff AFS, California, 1 March 1960-1 April 1966

See also
 List of USAF Aerospace Defense Command General Surveillance Radar Stations
 Aerospace Defense Command Fighter Squadrons

References

  A Handbook of Aerospace Defense Organization 1946 - 1980,  by Lloyd H. Cornett and Mildred W. Johnson, Office of History, Aerospace Defense Center, Peterson Air Force Base, Colorado
 Winkler, David F. (1997), Searching the skies: the legacy of the United States Cold War defense radar program. Prepared for United States Air Force Headquarters Air Combat Command.
 Ravenstein, Charles A. (1984). Air Force Combat Wings Lineage and Honors Histories 1947-1977. Maxwell AFB, Alabama: Office of Air Force History. .
 Radomes.org Air Defense Radar Stations

Por
1958 establishments in Oregon
1966 disestablishments in Oregon
Military units and formations disestablished in 1966